Bernardo Lauri (died 12 March 1516) was a Roman Catholic prelate who served as Bishop of Policastro (1504–1516).

Biography
On 22 Apr 1504, Bernardo Lauri was appointed by Pope Julius II as Bishop of Policastro. On 2 Feb 1505, he was consecrated bishop. He served as Bishop of Policastro until his death on 12 Mar 1516.

References

External links and additional sources
 (for Chronology of Bishops) 
 (for Chronology of Bishops) 

16th-century Italian Roman Catholic bishops
1516 deaths
Bishops appointed by Pope Julius II